Brachylomia elda is a moth of the family Noctuidae first described by George Hazen French in 1887. It is typically found west of the Rocky Mountains, from British Columbia south to California and Nevada.  It was first identified at Upper Soda Springs, Siskiyou County, California.

Adults are on wing from June to September.

References

External links
Original description: French, G. H. (1887). "A New Homohadena". The Canadian Entomologist.

Moths described in 1887
Brachylomia